The 2012 Hong Kong–Shanghai Inter Club Championship was held on 1 November and 10 November 2012. The first leg will be played at Tseung Kwan O Sports Ground, Tseung Kwan O, Hong Kong, with the second leg taken place at Yuanshen Sports Centre Stadium, Shanghai.
Current defending champions of Hong Kong First Division League Kitchee was selected to represent Hong Kong while Chinese League One champions Shanghai Tellace represents Shanghai.

Kitchee suffered a 4–0 defeat at home and they failed to make a win in Shanghai as they lost 2–3. Shanghai Tellace is the champions of 2012 Hong Kong–Shanghai Inter Club Championship.

Squads

Kitchee

Shanghai Tellace

Match details

First leg

Second leg

References

2012–13 in Hong Kong football
Hong Kong–Shanghai Inter Club Championship